Lockport Industrial District is a national historic district located at Lockport in Niagara County, New York.  The district features the two sets of Erie Canal locks constructed in 1859 and 1909–1918, respectively known as the Northern Tier and Southern Tier.  Also in the district are the remains of industrial buildings built along the related hydraulic raceway along the north side of the canal.

It was listed on the National Register of Historic Places in 1975.

References

Historic districts on the National Register of Historic Places in New York (state)
Buildings and structures in Niagara County, New York
National Register of Historic Places in Niagara County, New York
1975 establishments in New York (state)